Elmer Joseph Gedeon (December 5, 1893 – May 19, 1941) was a second baseman in Major League Baseball. He played for the Washington Senators, New York Yankees, and St. Louis Browns.

Born in Sacramento, California, Gedeon started his professional baseball career in 1912 in the Pacific Coast League. He won a job with the Senators the following season. Gedeon hit poorly in limited action and went back to the PCL in 1914. In 1915, he had the best offensive season of his career with the Salt Lake City Bees, batting .317 and slugging .514 in 190 games.

For most of the next five seasons, Gedeon was a regular with the Yankees and Browns. He was an above-average defensive player, leading all American League second basemen in assists once (1918) and fielding percentage twice (1918 and 1919). In 1920, he led the AL in sacrifice hits with 48; this total is still a Browns/Orioles single season record.

Gedeon – who was a friend of Black Sox conspirator Swede Risberg – was present during a meeting with gamblers, as they were discussing the plot to fix the 1919 World Series. He was later called as a witness in the trial. On November 3, 1921, Gedeon was banned for life from organized baseball for "having guilty knowledge" of the Black Sox Scandal.

He died in San Francisco, California at the age of 47, having suffered from cirrhosis of the liver. The official cause of death was bronchial pneumonia. His nephew, Elmer Gedeon, was one of only two Major League Baseball players to be killed in World War II, dying in 1944.

See also
 List of people banned from Major League Baseball

References

External links

 Obituary at TheDeadballEra.com

1893 births
1941 deaths
Major League Baseball second basemen
Baseball players from Sacramento, California
Washington Senators (1901–1960) players
New York Yankees players
St. Louis Browns players
Salt Lake City Bees players
San Francisco Seals (baseball) players
Los Angeles Angels (minor league) players
Alcohol-related deaths in California
Deaths from cirrhosis